Monika Bauerlein (born 1965) is the current CEO of Mother Jones. Previously she was co-editor of the title and, earlier in her career, a writer for other publications.

Bauerlein was born in Germany, but has lived in several countries, including Italy, where her father, Heinz Bäuerlein, as foreign correspondent for public broadcast covered everything from cholera epidemics to papal conclaves. She came to America on a Fulbright scholarship and worked as a stringer for a variety of publications including Germany's Die Zeit and the Associated Press. Between 1991 and 2000, she was a writer, managing editor, and interim editor in chief at City Pages, which became the sister paper to the Village Voice in Minneapolis/St. Paul in 1997.

Bauerlein was promoted to the position of Mother Jones CEO in May 2015, following the departure of Madeleine Buckingham; previously she was the magazine's co-editor. Bauerlein first came to Mother Jones in 2000, and has, together with editor-in-chief Clara Jeffery, dramatically expanded its political and investigative reportage, as well as spearheaded the magazine's new investigative team and Washington bureau.

Together, Bauerlein and Jeffery overhauled the website of Mother Jones, putting a greater emphasis on staff-generated, daily news and original reporting. During their tenure, the magazine won three National Magazine Awards, two for General Excellence. Mother Jones broke the "47 percent" story about Republican presidential candidate Mitt Romney, credited by some with having a significant effect on the 2012 United States presidential election.

In August 2013, Bauerlein shared the PEN/Nora Magid Award for Magazine Editing with Clara Jeffery for their work at Mother Jones. The judges wrote: "Mother Jones under Jeffery and Bauerlein has been transformed from what was a respected—if-under-the-radar—indie publication to an internationally recognized powerhouse [...] whose writers and reporters often put more well-known and deep-pocketed news divisions to shame."

References

External links
 Monika Bauerlein at Mother Jones
 Power Sharing Women Take Over Mother Jones by J. Trout Lowen in Women's E-News, October 2, 2006
 "Mother Jones Names Monika Bauerlein Chief Executive Officer, Clara Jeffery Editor In Chief"

1965 births
Living people
American magazine editors
Women magazine editors
German emigrants to the United States